McAllister-Beaver House is a historic home located at Bellefonte, Centre County, Pennsylvania.  It was built about 1850, and is a massive two-story, five bay rectangular limestone building.   It measures 42 feet, 4 inches, across and 34 feet, 2 inches, deep in the Georgian style architecture.  It has a low pitch, gable roof and a center hall plan interior. A rear kitchen ell was added in 1913.  It was home to two prominent residents: Hugh N. McAllister, one of the founders of the Pennsylvania State University, and Gov. James A. Beaver.

United States Senator for Pennsylvania Bob Casey currently (as of November 2020) maintains one of his seven statewide offices in the McAllister-Beaver House.

The house was added to the National Register of Historic Places in 1982.

References

Houses on the National Register of Historic Places in Pennsylvania
Georgian architecture in Pennsylvania
Houses completed in 1850
Houses in Centre County, Pennsylvania
National Register of Historic Places in Centre County, Pennsylvania
Individually listed contributing properties to historic districts on the National Register in Pennsylvania